José Manuel Agüero Tovar (born 5 October 1971) is a Mexican politician from the Institutional Revolutionary Party. From 2009 to 2012 he served as Deputy of the LXI Legislature of the Mexican Congress representing Morelos.

References

1971 births
Living people
People from Jiutepec
Members of the Chamber of Deputies (Mexico) for Morelos
Institutional Revolutionary Party politicians
21st-century Mexican politicians
Politicians from Morelos
Monterrey Institute of Technology and Higher Education alumni
Deputies of the LXI Legislature of Mexico